Megachile chrysognatha is a species of bee in the family Megachilidae. It was described by Theodore Dru Alison Cockerell in 1943.

References

Chrysognatha
Insects described in 1943